Jerry's Famous Deli was a chain of Jewish delicatessens. The original deli was founded in Studio City, Los Angeles, in 1978 by Isaac Starkman and Jerry Seidman. The CEO was Starkman's son, Guy Starkman. While the chain is no longer operating, there is a single similar location, Jerry's Patio Cafe & Bar, in Marina del Rey, CA is now owned by Jonathan and Mandy Mitchell.  The deli chain is noted for its celebrity clientele, which has included Adam Sandler, Will Smith, Shaquille O'Neal, and the cast of Seinfeld. Andy Kaufman once worked at the Studio City deli as a busboy.

Locations

On May 18, 2002, the original Jerry's Famous Deli in Studio City sustained a fire which caused the building $2,000,000 worth of damage. The location reopened on September 16, 2003, with the founders present as well as Los Angeles City Councilman Zev Yaroslavsky and celebrities such as actor Robbie Williams.

On March 20 2012, the Costa Mesa branch of Jerry's Famous Deli closed permanently after the landlord did not renew the restaurant's lease.

On May 31, 2013, the Beverly locale, which had been extant 20 years, closed permanently.

On October 16, 2016, the Woodland Hills Jerry's Famous Deli closed permanently.

On August 25, 2020, the Jerry's Famous Deli in Marina del Rey reopened as Jerry's Patio Cafe & Bar, offering outdoor dining and takeout, in order to continue operation amidst the COVID-19 pandemic. Although not officially named Jerry's Famous Deli, this location is now also closed.  Its website says it will be back one day.

On October 30, 2020, the original Jerry's Famous Deli in Studio City closed permanently due to the COVID-19 pandemic. It had been extant for 42 years.

See also

 List of delicatessens

References

External links

Jewish delicatessens in the United States
Defunct restaurants in Los Angeles
Defunct Jewish delicatessens
Jews and Judaism in California
Restaurants established in 1978
1978 establishments in California
Jews and Judaism in Los Angeles